Ralph Nelson Good (April 25, 1886 – November 24, 1965), nicknamed "Holy", was an American professional baseball player with the Boston Doves in 1910. A pitcher, he appeared in two games without a decision. Good was 6'0 and weighed 165 lbs. He batted and threw right-handed.

Sources 
http://thebaseballcube.com/players/G/Ralph-Good.shtml Ralph Good's Stats

Boston Doves players
Baseball players from Maine
Colby Mules baseball players
People from Aroostook County, Maine
People from Waterville, Maine
1886 births
1965 deaths